Theatrum Chemicum Britannicum first published in 1652, is an extensively annotated compilation of English alchemical literature selected by Elias Ashmole. The book preserved and made available many works that had previously existed only in privately held manuscripts. It features the alchemical verse of people such as Thomas Norton, George Ripley, Geoffrey Chaucer, John Gower, John Lydgate, John Dastin, Abraham Andrews and William Backhouse.

In his preface Ashmole says of himself, "I must profess I know enough to hold my tongue, but not enough to speak."

Contents
The volume is described as Theatrum Chemicum Britannicum. Containing Severall Poetical Pieces of our Famous English Philosophers, who have written the Hermetique Mysteries in their owne Ancient Language. Faithfully Collected into one Volume, with Annotations thereon, by Elias Ashmole, Esq. Qui est Mercuriophilus Anglicus. The first part, London, Printed by J. Grismond for Nath: Brooke, at the Angel in Cornhill. MDCLII. The compilation contains the following collection of works, several of which are by unknown authors:

Elias Ashmole. Prologue. January 26, 1652.
Thomas Norton. The Ordinall of Alchimy.
George Ripley. The Compound of Alchymie.
Anonymous. Liber patris sapientiae.
Verse beginning "In the name of the holy Triniti".
Verse beginning "Iyfe thow wilt thys warke begyn."
Anonymous. Hermes Bird.
Geoffry Chaucer. The Tale of the Chanans Yeoman.
John Dastin.The Worke of John Dastin. or Dastin's Dreame.
Pearce the Black Monke upon the Elixir.
The Worke of Rich: Carpenter. or Carpenter's Worke
Abraham Andrews. The Hunting of the Greene Lyon.
Thomas Charnock. The Breviary of naturall Philosophy. 1557.
Thomas Charnock. Aenigma ad Alchimiam. 1572. 
Thomas Charnock. Aenigma de Alchimiae. 1572. 
William Bloomefield. Bloomfields Blossoms: or, The Campe of Philosophy.
Edward Kelley. Sir Edward Kelle's Worke.
Edward Kelley. Sir Ed: Kelly concerning the Philosophers Stone written to his especiall good Freind, G.S. Gent.
John Dee. Testamentum Johannis Dee Philosophi summi ad Johannem Gwynn, transmissum 1568.
Thomas Robinson. Thomas Robinsonus de lapide philosophorum.
Anonymous. Experience and Philosophy.
W.B. The Magistery. December, 1633. (Revealed to be by William Backhouse in Ashmole's annotated copy of the book)
Anonymi: or, severall workes of unknowne Authors.
John Gower. John Gower concerning the Philosophers Stone.
George Ripley. The Vision of Sr: George Ripley: Channon of Bridlington.
George Ripley. 
George Ripley. The Mistery of alchymists, Composed by Sir Geo: Ripley Chanon of Bridlington.
George Ripley. The Preface prefixt to Sir Geo: Ripley's Medulla. 1476. 
George Ripley. A shorte worke That beareth the Name of the aforesaid Author, Sir G. Ripley.
John Lydgate. Translation of the second Epistle that King Alexander sent to his Master Aristotle.
Anonymi.
Anonymous. The Hermet's Tale.
Anonymous. A Discription of the Stone.
Anonymous. The standing of the Glasse for the tyme of the Putrefaction, and Congelation of the Medicine.
D.D.W. Bedman. or W. Redman. Aenigma Philosophicum.
Fragments
Thomas Charnock. Fragments coppied From Thomas Charnock's owne hand writing. 1574.
In some Coppies I have found these Verses placed before Pearce the Black Monk, upon the Elixir.
I have seene an old Coppy of the said work of Pearce the Black Monk, to the end of which these following Verses were joyned.
This following Fragment in some copies I have found placed at the end of the aforegoing Exposition of Pearce the Black Monke. A Conclusion.
An other Conclusion.
The whole Scyence.
Annotations and Discourses, upon Some part of the preceding Worke.
A table of the several Treatises, with their Authors Names, contained in this Worke.
A Table explaining the Obscure, Obsolete, and mis-spell'd words used throughout this Worke.

References

External links
 1652 Edition at the Internet Archive
 English Alchemical verse from Theatrum Chemicum Britannicum on The Alchemy Website.
High-resolution scans of title page and all plates from 1652 edition freely available for download in variety of formats from Science History Institute Digital Collections at digital.sciencehistory.org

1652 books
Alchemical documents